is a puzzle game developed by Tecmo in 1986 for an arcade release on custom hardware based on the Z80 chipset. It was ported to multiple systems including the Nintendo Entertainment System and Commodore 64. The PC Engine version was known as Zipang and the Game Boy version as Solomon's Club. A prequel, Solomon's Key 2, was released in 1992 for the NES.

Gameplay

The player, controlling a sorcerer known only as Dana, must overcome unlimited enemy spawning, challenging level designs, a countdown timer, instant death from any physical contact with enemies, and limited ways to dispatch enemies.

Dana is sent to retrieve Solomon's Key to restore the world to light from demons that were accidentally released. The object of the game is to advance through the 50 rooms of "Constellation Space" by acquiring a key to the door that leads to the next room before a timer runs out. The game incorporates elements of the platform shooter genre. Dana can run, jump, create or destroy orange blocks adjacent to him as well as create fireballs to destroy demons. The orange blocks can also be destroyed by hitting them with the character's head twice. Along the way Dana can acquire items to upgrade his firepower and extra lives, as well as items that award bonus points and unlock hidden rooms. With certain items, Dana must make, then break blocks (sometimes in a certain manner) to make these appear.

In the NES version, a "GDV" (Game Deviation Value) score also appears at the game over screen. The score uses a weighted composite of several factors (like levels completed, items found, time and points) which gives the player a good idea of how well the last game was played. The higher the GDV, the better the game.

Solomon's Key has many hidden items and secret levels that are hard to find which enhances the reward for playing. The ending slightly changes depending on which secret levels, if any, the player finds and completes.

Levels
There are 64 levels in total, of which 15 are secret and one is the final level. The main 48 levels are divided into groups of 4 with one group for each of the 12 Zodiac constellation (in order, Aries, Taurus. Gemini, Cancer, Leo, Virgo, Libra, Scorpio, Sagittarius, Capricorn, Aquarius and Pisces). The final level is called Solomon's room. Each constellation has a secret bonus room which can only be accessed by finding a seal for the constellation in the last room of the group. The other three levels are Page of Time, Page of Space and the Princess Room, which occur only if the player has acquired the hidden Seals of Solomon.

Development 
Solomon's Key was designed by Michitaka Tsuruta, who took inspiration from Lode Runner and added the ability to both destroy and create tiles. The initial game design leaned towards being more of an action title until Tsuruta's boss at Tecmo, Kazutoshi Ueda, suggested it incorporate puzzle elements. Tsuruta took inspiration from Greek mythology as well as the film Jason and the Argonauts for the visual aesthetic of the game. The title of the game itself came from the sales manager, Harano, after one of the developers explained that the star-like symbol throughout the levels was the seal of Solomon and that there was a book called the Key of Solomon. "I like it," Harano stated, at which point it got its title.

Ports
In 1988, a port of Solomon's Key was released for the Master System in Japan.

In 1990, Pack-In-Video converted the game for the PC Engine under the title Zipang.

In April 1991, a Game Boy version was released under the title Solomon's Club. It was developed by Graphic Research.

In July 2019, the classic NES version was released for the Nintendo Switch as Arcade Archives Solomon's Key, published by Hamster.

Reception 
In Japan, Game Machine listed Solomon's Key on their September 1, 1986 issue as being the eighteenth most-successful table arcade unit of the month. Solomon's Key sold 300,000 copies in Japan.

Legacy 
The NES version of the game was released for the Wii Virtual Console on November 19, 2006 in North America and on December 15, 2006 in the PAL regions. Later, it was also released on the Nintendo 3DS and Wii U Virtual Console. Since then, it has been released as part of the Nintendo Switch Online: Nintendo Entertainment System games. A 'reverse engineered' port from the Atari ST version was released for the Commodore Amiga in 2013.

In 1992, a prequel was released for the NES named Solomon's Key 2 (called Fire 'n Ice in North America).

Monster Rancher Explorer (Solomon in Japan), also released by Tecmo, features the same gameplay but with Monster Rancher characters.

References

External links

Solomon's Key at Arcade Archives Page

1986 video games
Amstrad CPC games
Arcade video games
Atari ST games
Commodore 64 games
Crossover video games
Famicom Disk System games
Game Boy games
Master System games
Mobile games
Nintendo Entertainment System games
Nintendo Switch games
PlayStation 4 games
Puzzle video games
Single-player video games
Tecmo games
TurboGrafx-16 games
U.S. Gold games
Video games about witchcraft
Video games developed in Japan
Video games with alternate endings
Virtual Console games
Virtual Console games for Wii U
ZX Spectrum games
Nintendo Switch Online games
Hamster Corporation games